Revenge is a 1978 Romanian action film directed by Sergiu Nicolaescu.

Cast 
 Gheorghe Dinică - Paraipan
 Sergiu Nicolaescu - Tudor Moldovan
 Jean Constantin - Limba
 Amza Pellea - Pirvu
 Ion Besoiu - Zavoianu
 Mircea Albulescu - Geissler
 Silviu Stănculescu - Lt. Col. Riosianu
  - Doctorul
 
 Colea Răutu - Grigore Maimuca
 Iurie Darie - Constantin David

References

External links 

1978 action films
1978 films
Films directed by Sergiu Nicolaescu
Films set in Romania
Films set in 1940
Films set in 1941
Romanian action films
1970s Romanian-language films